The Front for Democracy (Frente por la Democracia or El Frente) was a political party in Guatemala. In the legislative elections held on 9 September 2007, the party secured 0.91% of the votes in the race for national-list deputies and, save for defections, will have no seats in the 2008-12 Congress.

References
Manifesto

Catholic political parties
Christian democratic parties in South America
Defunct political parties in Guatemala
Direct democracy parties
Political parties disestablished in 2007
Political parties established in 2003